Hickory Valley may refer to several places in the United States:

 Hickory Valley, Arkansas
 Hickory Valley, Louisiana
 Hickory Valley, Tennessee